Nityananda Samntaray (25 April1933 – 23 February 2018) was an Indian politician who belonged to Odisha. He was active in politics with Indian National Congress, and was elected to Odisha Legislative Assembly from Tirtol Assembly constituency in 1985 Odisha Legislative Assembly election.

Early life, education and family

Samntaray was born on 25 April 1933 to Bhagaban Samantray and Radhamani Samantray at Kolar village in Cuttack district.

Political career 
Samntaray was active in Odisha politics with the Indian National Congress party and was elected to the 9th Odisha Legislative Assembly from Tirtol Assembly constituency in 1985. Later he contested in 1991 and 1996 Indian general election from Jagatsinghpur Lok Sabha constituency, but defeated both the times.

Death 
Samantray died at 84 on 23 February 2018 due to Cardiac arrest.

References 

1933 births
2018 deaths
People from Cuttack district
Odisha MLAs 1985–1990
Indian National Congress politicians from Odisha